Filaminast (code name WAY-PDA 641) was a drug candidate developed by Wyeth-Ayerst. It is a phosphodiesterase 4 inhibitor (PDE4 inhibitor) and an analog of rolipram, which served as a prototype molecule for several development efforts. It was discontinued after a Phase II trial showed that its therapeutic window was too narrow; it could not be dosed high enough without causing significant side effects (nausea and vomiting), which was a problem with the rolipram class of molecules.

See also
 Piclamilast
 Roflumilast

References 

Abandoned drugs
Carbamates
PDE4 inhibitors
Phenol ethers